Silverleigh is a rural locality in the Toowoomba Region, Queensland, Australia.

Geography 
The Oakey–Cooyar Road runs through the north-western corner.

History 
A Lutheran congregation formed in 1899 and in November 1890 opened St Paul's Lutheran Church. In 1991, due to differences of opinion on religious issues, the church separated from the Lutheran Church of Australia and, in 1992, joined with a number of other like-minded Lutheran congregations to form the Australian Evangelical Lutheran Church.

Local residents requested a school in 1901. Tenders were called to construct the school in May 1902. Boah Peak Provisional School opened circa September 1902, being renamed Silverleigh Provisional School in 1904. On 1 January 1909, it became Silverleigh State School. It closed on 4 June 1967. It was at 836 Acland Silverleigh Road.

Amenities 
Despite the name, St Paul's Lutheran Church, Greenwood, is at  617 Acland Silverleigh Road in Silverleigh.

References

Further reading 

  — includes Gowrie Little Plains School, Aubigny School, Crosshill School, Devon Park State School, Silverleigh State School, Boodua School, Greenwood State School, Kelvinhaugh State School

Toowoomba Region
Localities in Queensland